Gianni Di Lorenzo (born 20 April 1948) is an Italian racing cyclist. He rode in the 1974 Tour de France.

References

External links
 

1948 births
Living people
Italian male cyclists
Sportspeople from Monza
Cyclists from the Province of Monza e Brianza